Borve is a village on the west coast of the island of Barra in the Outer Hebrides, Scotland. Borve is within the parish of Barra, and is situated on the A888 which is the island's circular main road.

History

There are a number of neolithic remains nearby, including a burial cairn, and standing stones. A rich Viking burial was unearthed in the vicinity of Borve at a site called Ardvouray in 1862, the contents of which can be found in the British Museum. The grave included amongst other things a pair of oval brooches, a comb, fragments of a drinking horn, a spear, a pair of shears, a weaving sword and a whetstone.

References

External links

Canmore - Barra, Borve site record
Canmore - Barra, Borve Standing Stones site record
Canmore - Barra, Borve Viking Burial site record
Canmore - Barra, Sligeanach Cairn site record
Canmore - Barra, Dun Borve site record

Villages on Barra